Sultan Ismail may refer to several rulers named Ismail with the title of sultan:
 Sultan Ismail I of Granada
 Sultan Ismail II of Granada
 Sultan Ismail, 25th Sultan of Kelantan (1920-1944)
 Sultan Ismail of Johor, Sultan of Johor (1959-1981)
 Sultan Ismail Muabidin Riayat Shah, Sultan of Perak (1871-1874)
 Sultan Ismail Nasiruddin Shah, fourth Yang di-Pertuan Agong of Malaysia and Sultan of Terengganu (1945-1979)
 Sultan Ismail Petra, 28th Sultan of Kelantan (1979-2010)
 Ismail Ibn Sharif, Sultan of Morocco (1672–1727)